Disasuridia rubida is a moth of the subfamily Arctiinae. It was described by Cheng-Lai Fang in 1991. It is found in the Chinese province of Yunnan and in India. It is the type species of its genus.

References

Moths described in 1991
Arctiinae